Komsomol, Kazakhstan is the administrative center of Ayteke Bi (Kazakh: Әйтеке би ауданы) district of Aktobe Region.

References

Populated places in Aktobe Region